Indianapolis Park or Athletic Park (II) was a baseball ground in Indianapolis, Indiana. It was the Sunday home field of the Indianapolis Hoosiers baseball club of the National League from 1888 to 1889.

It was located on a block bounded by New York Street (north, left field); Arsenal Avenue (east, right field); Ohio Street (south, first base); and Hanna Street (now Oriental Street) (west, third base).

The venue was used for Sunday games due to blue laws that prevented play at their primary home, Tinker Park. During 1887, the club had used the Bruce Grounds for Sunday games, but it was thought to be too far away from the city center to draw well.

The ballpark site is now occupied by a residential neighborhood.

See also
List of baseball parks in Indianapolis

References

Sources
Peter Filichia, Professional Baseball Franchises, Facts on File, 1993.

External links
Sanborn map showing most of the ballpark, 1898

Defunct Major League Baseball venues
Defunct baseball venues in the United States
Sports venues in Indianapolis
Defunct sports venues in Indiana